Lossiemouth Football Club are a senior football club from Lossiemouth, Moray, Scotland. They play in the Highland Football League.

Founded in 1945, they were admitted to the Highland League the following year and have played there ever since. The club's home is Grant Park.

Traditionally a team hovering around the lower end of the league table, Lossiemouth have enjoyed several cup successes, including a hat-trick of North of Scotland Cups and a memorable, last-minute victory, in the Highland League Cup over Fraserburgh.

Lossiemouth are full members of the Scottish Football Association, and are therefore permitted to play in the Scottish Cup.

Stadium

Lossiemouth play at Grant Park in Lossiemouth. It has a capacity of 3,250, including 250 seats.

Club honours
League Cup:
Winners: 1961–62, 1996–97
North of Scotland Cup:
Winners: 1994–95, 1995–96, 1996–97, 2000–01, 2002–03
Scottish Supplementary Cup (North):
Winners: 1956–57

External links
 Official website

 
Football clubs in Scotland
Highland Football League teams
Association football clubs established in 1945
1945 establishments in Scotland
Football in Moray
Lossiemouth